Al Akhdar is a village in Ad Dhahirah Region, in northeastern Oman. It lies just to the northwest of the regional capital of Ibri along Highway 21. The village contains a post office and has been assigned the postcode 516.

References

Populated places in Ad Dhahirah North Governorate